Chaetostoma leucomelas is a species of catfish in the family Loricariidae. It is native to South America, where it occurs in the basins of the Patía River and the Cauca River in Colombia. The species reaches 20 cm (7.9 inches) SL.

References 

Fish described in 1918
leucomelas